Nickeas is a surname. Notable people with the surname include:

Mark Nickeas (born 1956), English football defender
Mike Nickeas (born 1983), Canadian former professional baseball catcher
Nicholas Charles Nickeas (1946–2011), American sportscaster and journalist